Cape Robinson is a cape marking the east end of Cole Peninsula, between Cabinet and Mill Inlets on Foyn Coast, Graham Land. Absence of photographs of this island by Wilkins has prevented its positive reidentification. For this reason, and for the sake of historical continuity, it is recommended that the east end of the peninsula here described be given the name Cape Robinson. This cape was charted by the Falkland Islands Dependencies Survey (FIDS) and photographed from the air by the Ronne Antarctic Research Expedition (RARE) in 1947.

Headlands of Graham Land
Foyn Coast